Frank McCrystal was the head coach of the Regina Rams, the CIS football team at the University of Regina in Regina, Saskatchewan, Canada from 1981 to 2014. In 2007, McCrystal was named Canadian Interuniversity Sport Coach of the Year and received the 2007 Frank Tindall Trophy award. Coach McCrystal accepted the head coaching position at the University of Regina in 1984. 2012 is his 29th year with the Rams, and the 14th since they joined the C.I.S.

References

Regina Rams coaches
Sportspeople from Regina, Saskatchewan
Living people
Year of birth missing (living people)